Gellan tetrasaccharide unsaturated glucuronyl hydrolase (UGL, unsaturated glucuronyl hydrolase) is an enzyme with systematic name beta-D-4-deoxy-Delta4-GlcAp-(1->4)-beta-D-Glcp-(1->4)-alpha-L-Rhap-(1->3)-beta-D-Glcp beta-D-4-deoxy-Delta4-GlcAp hydrolase. This enzyme catalyses the following chemical reaction

 beta-D-4-deoxy-Delta4-GlcAp-(1->4)-beta-D-Glcp-(1->4)-alpha-L-Rhap-(1->3)-beta-D-Glcp + H2O  5-dehydro-4-deoxy-D-glucuronate + beta-D-Glcp-(1->4)-alpha-L-Rhap-(1->3)-beta-D-Glcp

The enzyme releases 4-deoxy-4(5)-unsaturated D-glucuronic acid from oligosaccharides produced by polysaccharide lyases.

References

External links 
 

EC 3.2.1